Frank Dexter (1882–1965) was a German-born American art director.

Selected filmography
 Damaged Goods (1937)
 Drums of Destiny (1937)
 Raw Timber (1937)
 Fugitive Lady (1938)
 My Old Kentucky Home (1938)
 Girl from Rio (1939)
 Rubber Racketeers (1942)
 The Gay Amigo (1949)
 Amazon Quest (1949)

References

Bibliography
 Gevinson, Alan. Within Our Gates: Ethnicity in American Feature Films, 1911-1960. University of California Press, 1997.

External links

1882 births
1965 deaths
American art directors
German art directors
German emigrants to the United States